John C. Wright is an American author and pioneer of America's Great loop. Best known in the trades as Capt. John. His first documented voyage around the Loop was completed in 1971. He is best known for his books about living aboard and cruising America's Great Loop. His Best-Selling books include "The Looper's Companion Guide", "Looping by the Numbers", and "More Fun Than Fuel". His "The Looper's Companion Guide" earned him the Great Loop 2019 Book of the Year. Capt. John maintains a popular website about living aboard and cruising America's Great Loop. Publishers Weekly said he "may be the most influential author of Great Loop books on Market."

Biography
John C. Wright (sailor, author,) (born 1948 -) Capt. John is an accomplished sailor and known for his voyages around America's Great Loop. He was born John Clifton Wright, and attended Terrell High School, Dallas Baptist College, East Texas State College, and served in the U.S. Army during the Vietnam War as CW2 helicopter pilot. Upon returning from the Army, he began his career with Honeywell Information Systems. He retired as Senior Executive and a Registered Lobbyist with Honeywell. Capt. John spends his retirement cruising America's Great Loop. He maintains one of the most popular "Great Loop" websites on the Internet with over a million. He is also an active lobbyist for keeping the Great Loop waterways open for navigation through the Chicago Sanitary and Ship Canal that links the Great Lakes to the Illinois river and the Mississippi river basin, where an Asian Carp invasion threatens a hard lock closure of the USCG's Electronic Fish Barrier on the connecting navigable waterway.

Books
 BYOB Bring Your Own Boat Series
 The Looper's Companion Guide(2018)
 Once Around Is Not Enough(2016)
 America's Great Loop and Beyond(2014)
 More Fun than Fuel (2021)
 Looping By The Numbers(2022)
 The Frugal Voyager (2011)

References 

a b Publishers Weekly. April 24, 2018. 
a b c The Looper's Companion Guide. Anchor Publishing. July 2019.  
 Wright, John C. (September 12, 2018). "Cruising the Great Loop" www.captainjohn.org. Retrieved December 8, 2019. 
 Wright, John C. (October 21, 2017). "The Voyage of the Century". www.captainjohn.org.  
 John C. Wright's Capt. John Live: APLLC Excerpt Archived January 3, 2017, at the Trade Center
 Capt. John (August 21–23, 2018). Featured Guest Speaker, USACE Mobile District, Tennessee-Tombigbee Development Conference.

1948 births
Living people
United States Army aviators
United States Army personnel of the Vietnam War
Texas A&M University–Commerce alumni
21st-century American male writers